Looney Tunes Mouse Chronicles: The Chuck Jones Collection is a DVD and Blu-ray set featuring cartoons focusing on Hubie and Bertie and Sniffles and featuring various other mouse characters in Merrie Melodies and Looney Tunes shorts. It was released on August 28, 2012.

Disc 1
All cartoons on this disc star Sniffles and are directed by Chuck Jones.

Special feature
 Naughty but Mice commentary by Jerry Beck

Disc 2
All cartoons on this disc star Hubie and Bertie and are directed by Chuck Jones.

Special features
 Bonus documentary: "Of Mice and Pen"
 Audio commentaries
 The Aristo-Cat commentary by Eddie Fitzgerald 
 The Aristo-Cat commentary by Greg Ford with Chuck Jones
 Mouse Wreckers commentary by Greg Ford
 The Hypo-Chondri-Cat commentary by Jerry Beck
 The Hypo-Chondri-Cat storyboard reel
 11 bonus cartoons:

References

Looney Tunes home video releases